The Cumana Song (La Cumana) is a mambo tune written by jazz pianist Barclay Allen, together with Harold Spina and Roc Hillman and released by Barclay Allen's Rhythm Four on Capitol 15107 in 1947. Its signature riff is a fast moody change between two chords (chiefly F minor 6, or its tritone substitution, and C minor seventh) with some syncopation added. This tune, in its original context, is in the key of E Flat major with some parts sounding like they come from the relative key of C minor. The suggested tempo is 180 beats per minute, and this song in its original context takes about three and a half minutes to play, taking all repeats. Allen also recorded the tune with Freddy Martin And His Orchestra later in the year.

La Cumana has been featured on several episodes of "The Lawrence Welk Show".

Mambo
1947 songs
Songs with music by Harold Spina